Samuel F. Sandoval (October 24, 1923 – July 29, 2022) was an American Navajo World War II veteran.

Early life
Samuel Sandoval was born on October 24, 1923, to Julian Sandoval and Helen Smith in Nageezi, New Mexico. He had eight siblings: Mabel Sandoval-Penn, Bert, Betsy, Nellie, Robert, Merril, Rodger, and Beulah.

Honours

National honours
 
 Navy Unit Commendation
 Combat Action Ribbon
 China Service Medal
 World War II Victory Medal
 Navy Occupation Service Medal with Asia Clasp
 Asiatic–Pacific Campaign Medal with a silver star, in lieu of five bronze stars

References

1922 births
2022 deaths
21st-century Native Americans
20th-century Native Americans
Navajo code talkers
Native American military personnel
People from San Juan County, New Mexico